Kampi ya Njemi is a settlement in Kenya's Central Province. Latitude: -1.0
Longitude: 36.8
 
Altitude: 1856
Region: Western Province, Kenya.
Time Zone: Africa/Nairobi.
Population : 0
Geonames-ID: 194676

References 

Populated places in Central Province (Kenya)